Juliet Anna Owen Valpy Mackworth (23 August 1835 – 9 April 1911) was a New Zealand artist, and one of six children of William Henry Valpy and Caroline Valpy (born Jeffreys), a pioneering family who arrived in Dunedin, New Zealand in January 1849 aboard the Ajax. She was born in Sikraul Varanasi, Uttar Pradesh, India, where her father was a judge.

She married William Mackworth at her parents' home The Forbury, Dunedin, on 22 September 1852, in a double wedding with her sister Catherine, who was marrying James Fulton. Three days after the wedding, their father unexpectedly died. Mackworth and Valpy had a daughter, Wilhelmina, but he died while she was an infant. Valpy married Bayly Pike, and had four children with him.

Her watercolour paintings survive in the Hocken Collections.

References

External links
Profile of Juliet Valpy in the Dunedin Family History Group newsletter, June 2014: http://www.dunedinfamilyhistory.co.nz/wp-content/uploads/2014/01/DFHG-2014-june-newsletter.pdf

Artists from Dunedin
Valpy-Fulton-Jeffreys family
1835 births
1911 deaths
New Zealand painters
19th-century New Zealand artists
New Zealand women painters